This is a list of media from the Punjab region or published in the Punjabi language. Punjabi journalists have received many international awards for their reporting.

Major Punjabi newspapers and news organizations

Hong Kong
Punjabi Chetna(Punjabi Chetna)

India
Living India News
TBN The Benipal Network

 Greater Punjab News

Chardikla(Patiala)|Time TV]] (Chardikla)
Peddler Media (peddler media)
Azad Soch
Daily Ajit
The Tribune (The Tribune)
Kiddaan (Kiddaan)
Punjab Newsline 
Punjab Times 
Truescoop News(Get Latest Punjab News)(Truescoop News)
Rozana Spokesman
DeshVidesh Times
Punjab Hotline
Punjabi News Online
Punjab News Express
Doaba Headlines
Punjab Mail 
Monthly Wariam Jalandhar
Ghanchi Media

Italy

Canada
The Tv Nri
TBN The Benipal Network
Asian Vision
FYI Media Group Ltd
Punjab Newsline
Punjabi Daily
Sikh Press
Sanjh Savera
Ajit Weekly
Hamdard Media Group

Pakistan 
Sajjan
Khabran
Bhulekha

UK
Sikh Times
Akaal Channel

USA
TBN The Benipal Network
FYI MEDIA GROUP LTD
Punjab Mail USA
Quami Ekta 
Other major online Punjabi newspapers
Punjabi Chetna 
Chardhi Kala 
Punjab Newsline
DeshVidesh Times 
Wichaar
Media Punjab
Europe Samachar
Europe Vich Punjabi
Panjabi Today

Punjabi television channels

See also
List of Punjabi-language television channels
List of Punjabi-language newspapers
Ajit

References

External links
Punjabi Press Club Canada

Media
Punjab
Punjabi media
 
 
Media